The Disney California Adventure Food & Wine Festival is a food and drink festival that takes place each spring in Disney California Adventure in the Disneyland Resort in Anaheim, California.  The festival includes a number of themed kiosks, each featuring food and beverages from a particular aspect of California cuisine. Other offerings include wine and beer tastings, seminars, and cooking demonstrations.  This event was inspired by the similar but much larger Epcot International Food & Wine Festival.  This festival was held annually from 2006 through 2010, and was cancelled in 2011 when Disney California Adventure began a period of major construction. The event returned in the spring of 2016. In 2020, the festival ended abruptly amid the COVID-19 pandemic.

History

The festival took place annually from 2006 through 2010, and then went on hiatus when the park went under major construction.  The festival returned in the spring of 2016.

2006
The inaugural event featured two food service kiosks with 12 food offerings, each offering wine pairings and beer samples as well. The Golden Vine Winery patio hosted culinary demonstrations, wine, beer, and spirits seminars, guest sommelier education, a wine shop, and event merchandise shop.

The festival marketplaces included Bountiful Valley Farmers Market and Lucky Fortune Cookery.

2010
The 2010 event ran daily from April 16, 2010 through May 31, 2010 with the theme "The Art of Flavor".  The 2010 edition featured the Taste of California Marketplace with ten food offerings and wine and beer seminars at the Festival Showplace, located in the Hollywood Pictures Backlot section of the park.  Chef demonstrations took place at the Chef's Showcase Stage, situated in Sunshine Plaza.   Exclusive dinners, wine tastings and cooking school sessions could be attended at an additional cost.

2011 to 2015
The festival was not held due to park construction projects.

2016
The revamped 2016 edition of the festival ran from April 1, 2016 through May 1, 2016 on weekends and featured eight Festival Marketplace kiosks situated along the Disney California Adventure parade route.  The eight themed booths served dozens of selections of California-inspired cuisine included By the Bay, The Brewhouse, The Farm, Gold Rush, LAstyle, The Vineyard, ¡Viva Fresca!, and Wine Country.  Beverage seminars and demonstrations by celebrity chefs could again be attended for an additional cost.

2017
The 2017 festival ran daily from March 10, 2017 through April 16, 2017.  The newly expanded lineup of fifteen themed booths included Nuts About Cheese, Uncork California, I Heart Artichokes, Garlic Kissed, Olive Us, Bacon Twist, Lemon Grove, Seafood ... Sustained, Onion Lair, Off the Cob, Sweet and Sourdough, LAstyle, Wineology, The Brewhouse and Paradise Garden Grill Beer Garden.

2020
The 2020 California Adventure Food and Wine Festival began on February 28, 2020 and was scheduled to run until April 21, 2020, but on March 13, 2020 it ended early, caused by the closure of the park as a result of the COVID-19 pandemic.

2021
The festival was cancelled for the 2021 spring season due to the closure of the park, caused by the COVID-19 pandemic.

2022
The 2022 edition of the California Adventure Food and Wine Festival began on March 4, 2022 and will run until April 26, 2022.  The lineup of booths includes Avocado Time, Berry Patch, California Craft Brews, Cluck-a-Doodle Moo, D*Lish, Garlic Kissed, Golden Dreams, I Heart Artichokes, LAStyle, Nuts About Cheese, Peppers Cali-ente and Uncork California.   The festival again features culinary demonstrations, winemaker receptions and seminars and live entertainment.

2023
The 2023 festival will kick off on March 3, 2023 and continue through April 25, 2023.  The food kiosks, live entertainment and food and drink demonstrations and seminars are all scheduled to return.

See also
Epcot International Food & Wine Festival

References

External links
 

Food and drink festivals in the United States
Festivals in California
Wine festivals in the United States
Disney California Adventure